Lodovico Belluzzi was Captain Regent of San Marino, from April 1834 to October 1834. He shared his term with Francesco Guidi Giangi.

Captains Regent of San Marino
Members of the Grand and General Council
19th-century Italian people
Year of death missing
Year of birth missing